Double V is the debut studio album by the French rapper and comedian Mister V, released on 19 May 2017 under the record label "Hey Pelo Records" and "Musicast". After months the Double V went gold in France, eight months later, the album went platinum in France.,

Track listing
The entire album was produced by Geronimo Beats.

Charts

Weekly charts

Year-end charts

Certifications

References

2017 debut albums
Hip hop albums by French artists